The 1976 King Cup was the 18th season of the knockout competition since its establishment in 1956. 

Al-Nassr were the defending champions and successfully defended the title, winning their second one in a row. The final saw Al-Nassr beat Al-Ahli 2–0 at the Youth Welfare Stadium in Riyadh.

Bracket

Source: Al-Jazirah

Round of 32
The matches of the Round of 32 were held on 6, 7, 8, and 11 May 1976.

Round of 16
The Round of 16 matches were held on 13 and 14 May 1976.

Quarter-finals
The Quarter-final matches were held on 20 and 21 May 1976.

Semi-finals
The four winners of the quarter-finals progressed to the semi-finals. The semi-finals were played on 27 and 28 May 1976. All times are local, AST (UTC+3).

Final
The final was played between Al-Ahli and Al-Nassr in the Youth Welfare Stadium in Riyadh. This was Al-Ahli's 8th final. Previously Al-Ahli won six times in 1962, 1965, 1969, 1970, 1971, and 1973 and lost once in 1974 against Al-Nassr. This was Al-Nassr's 5th final. Previously Al-Nassr won once in 1974 and lost in 1967, 1971, and 1973. This was the fourth meeting between these two sides in the final. Al-Ahli won twice while Al-Nassr won once.

References

External links 

 rsssf.com

1976
Saudi Arabia
Cup